Myrtletown may refer to:

Myrtletown, California, United States
Myrtletown, Queensland, Australia